The Last Thing He Wanted is a 2020 political thriller film directed by Dee Rees, based on the 1996 novel of the same name by Joan Didion, from a screenplay by Rees and Marco Villalobos. The film stars Anne Hathaway, Ben Affleck, Rosie Perez, Edi Gathegi, Mel Rodriguez, Toby Jones, and Willem Dafoe.

The Last Thing He Wanted had its world premiere at the Sundance Film Festival on January 27, 2020, and was released on February 21, 2020, by Netflix. The film received negative reviews from critics, who criticized the writing.

Plot
Elena McMahon is a journalist reporting out of the Atlantic Post’s Central American bureau in El Salvador who is forced to flee during the civil war. A few years later she’s pushing to reopen the bureau, but her editor reveals that Congress is secretly pressuring the paper to dial back their coverage of Central and South American affairs, so reopening the bureau isn’t an option. Instead, he reassigns Elena to cover Ronald Reagan’s re-election campaign in 1984.

Elena reluctantly agrees to meet with her absentee father, Dick. She deduces that he’s still involved in trafficking illegal contraband, but also realizes that he is suffering from dementia.

She embarks on Reagan’s campaign trail. In Cincinnati, she uses her acquaintance with Helena Shultz to get a seat at the table of her husband, Secretary of State George Shultz during Helena’s birthday party. She attempts to question him but he stonewalls her until a staffer intervenes.

In Houston she meets with General Gus Sharp who had previously identified American shell casings in El Salvador as coming from a stockpile in Missouri. She shows him surveillance photos of shipping containers, which Sharp identifies as surplus arms from various National Guard units, including the 20th Special Forces.

Elena receives a call that Dick has been hospitalized. She hands off her assignment to her friend Alma and goes to Florida to take care of him. Dick begs her to meet his business associate, Sedlow, for an important deal that he has setup. She reluctantly agrees to effectively become an arms dealer, allowing her to investigate the story from the inside. Sedlow gives her specific instructions for how to deliver a large arms shipment to Costa Rica. She is to receive payment in traveler’s checks, but upon arriving in Costa Rica the buyer, Jones, shorts her, also paying in cocaine. When the cargo pilot she flew in with leaves without her, Jones drives her to San Jose. She seizes an opportunity to take his gun and vehicle, driving herself the rest of the way. When leaving Costa Rica she discovers the passport she was given has the name Elise Meyer. She manages to depart, narrowly avoiding trouble when her cab driver is stopped by security with her bag containing the cocaine and gun; the bag has her father’s male name on it, so the cab driver is arrested.

Secretary Shultz meets with Ambassador-at-Large Treat Morrison, who has been looking into Elena’s background since her original encounter with Shultz.

Elena ends up in Antigua, where she learns that her father has passed away. She attempts to enter the American embassy so she can get a proper passport, but it is the 4th of July, and nobody is available. Dejected, she returns to her hotel, where Morrison arrives, who hides his true agenda. After some mild verbal sparring, Elena sleeps with Morrison. She confesses to him who her father is and what she has been doing for him in Central America, believing that her focus on this story was motivated by the fact that she’s losing her connection to her daughter, Cat, who’s enrolled in a boarding school, and her work will be all she has.

The next day, Elena is by the hotel pool when Jones arrives and rescues her from an attack by gunmen. He escorts her to safety and explains to her that the deal her father was offered was fake, meant to lure Dick out of hiding. Morrison puts her in touch with Paul Schuster, who gives her a place to stay while things get sorted out. After several days at Paul’s, Morrison reaches out and lays out a plan to get her home, where she can break the story on the arms deals. The next day, a shooter arrives at Paul’s, killing him and his staff before calling out to Elena. She turns around to see Morrison, who fatally shoots her.

Morrison gives official testimony claiming he shot in self-defense. Meanwhile, Jones issues an official report to his superiors in French Intelligence revealing he had been trying to protect Elena. Finally, Alma uses all of the notes and information gathered by Elena to posthumously publish the story of the Iran-Contra Affair.

Cast

Production
In September 2017, it was announced Dee Rees would direct, based upon the novel of the same name by Joan Didion, from a screenplay by Marco Villalobos. Cassian Elwes would produce the film, under his Elevated Films banner. In February 2018, Anne Hathaway joined the cast of the film. In June 2018, Willem Dafoe joined the cast of the film. In July 2018, Ben Affleck, Toby Jones, Rosie Perez, Edi Gathegi, Mel Rodriguez and Carlos Leal joined the cast of the film.

The film, with a budget of $100 million, began principal photography in June 2018 in Puerto Rico.

Release
In May 2018, Netflix acquired distribution rights to the film. It had its world premiere at the Sundance Film Festival on January 27, 2020.

Reception
 

Nick Allen, a critic for RogerEbert.com, called the film "incomprehensible to an almost impressive degree [...] A true Netflix Original Film paradox – not even a pause and rewind button at the ready will help it make much sense."  Benjamin Lee of The Guardian called the movie "a two-hour film packed with too much and somehow not enough, The Last Thing He Wanted is a thing that no one wanted."

Accolades

References

External links
 

2020 films
2020 thriller films
2020s American films
2020s British films
2020s English-language films
2020s political thriller films
American political thriller films
British political thriller films
English-language Netflix original films
Films based on American novels
Films directed by Dee Rees
Films scored by Tamar-kali
Films set in Antigua and Barbuda
Films set in Costa Rica
Films set in Florida
Films shot in Puerto Rico